CECM may refer to:
 Centre for Experimental and Constructive Mathematics at the Simon Fraser University,
 Montreal Catholic School Commission (Commission des écoles catholiques de Montréal),
 ,
 Certified in Ethics and Compliance Management at the  John Cook School of Business (St. Louis University),
 Computer Engineering Course Management website of University of Tehran